Cosmopterix macroglossa is a moth in the family Cosmopterigidae. It was described by Edward Meyrick in 1913. It is found in South Africa.

The wingspan is 14–15 mm. The forewings are bronzy ochreous with a fine white costal streak from the base to the band and with the costal edge dark fuscous from the base to one-third of the wing. There is a slender white median streak reaching from the base to the band and a white subdorsal line from one-fourth to the band, converging to the apex of the median streak. The dorsal edge is white from the base to the band and there is a narrow pale ochreous-yellow median band, the anterior edge marked with two pale golden-metallic spots, the upper followed by a black dot and then by a fuscous mark interrupting the band, the posterior edge suffusedly margined with silvery followed by pale yellow, where a white streak (at first rather broad but soon becoming narrower) runs along the termen to the apex. The hindwings are pale grey.

References

Endemic moths of South Africa
Moths described in 1913
macroglossa